Tudu may refer to:

Geography
Tudu, Estonia, a settlement in Estonia
Tudu, Ghana, a place in Accra, Ghana
Tudu, Iran, a village in Iran

People
Bisweshwar Tudu, Indian politician
Budhiram Tudu (born 1991), Indian football player
Jabamani Tudu, Indian footballer
Laxman Tudu (born 1965), Indian politician
Maina Tudu (born 1984/85), Indian writer of Santali language and housewife
Rabilal Tudu (born 1949), Indian writer of Santali language and banker